Marie House Kohler (born 1951) is an American writer and playwright.  She is a member of the Kohler family of Wisconsin.

Biography
Playwright, theater producer, director and writer, Marie Kohler is the daughter of John Michael Kohler III and Julilly House. Raised in Kohler, Wisconsin at Riverbend, the home built by her grandfather Gov. Walter J. Kohler in 1923. Marie Kohler graduated from Kohler High School in 1969 and holds an Honors BA from Harvard University (1973, Magna Cum Laude) and an MA from the University of Wisconsin–Milwaukee(1979)- both degrees in English Literature.

Kohler co-founded Renaissance Theaterworks in Milwaukee, Wisconsin in 1993, with four other female theater professionals to create more opportunities for women in theater. She served there as Co-Artistic Director until 2013 and as Resident Playwright through 2019.

Career/Personal Life 
Kohler’s interest in theater began early, when her mother took her to local and national productions.  She formed the first drama club of her high school, earning her the school’s first “Humanities Award.” In college, she performed with the Harvard Dramatic Society, where she met Colin Cabot; they married in 1974.  The couple moved back to Wisconsin where Cabot worked at the Skylight Theatre. After the birth of their daughter, Anne, the family moved to Europe for a year when Cabot served as assistant to opera composer Gian Carlo Menotti in Scotland and Italy. When the couple returned to Milwaukee, Kohler began her master's work at the University of Wisconsin–Milwaukee, completing her degree in 1979. Their second daughter, Marie Christine, was born the same year. In 1980, Kohler began freelancing as a journalist for various Milwaukee- and Wisconsin-based publications, as well as national publications, such as American Theater Magazine and National Trust Magazine. 

In the mid-1980s, Kohler and Cabot separated, and Kohler she turned her attention to acting and writing plays and free-lance writing. 

In 1989, Kohler met Brian Mani while performing in Great Expectations; they married in 1992. Mani had a daughter, Tricia Hooper. Kohler has written several roles for Mani, a classically trained actor with American Players Theatre; they have worked often together on plays she has produced or directed. She has written six plays, all professionally produced and garnering strong notice and awards. The Milwaukee Arts Board named her Artist of the Year (2005). 

Kohler serves on the board of the Wisconsin Humanities Council and commits herself to environmental, cultural and social causes.

Directing Credits 
Full Productions

DEAR ELIZABETH by Sarah Ruhl, Milwaukee Chamber Theatre, 2015

THE KREUTZER SONATA by Nancy Harris, Renaissance Theaterworks, 2015

HONOUR by Joanna Murray-Smith, Renaissance Theaterworks, 2012

A PHOENIX TOO FREQUENT by Christopher Fry, Renaissance Theaterworks, 2012

Staged Readings

DUCK by Christine Kallmann, St. John's on the Lake, Milwaukee, 2017 

DUCK by Christine Kallmann, Brink New Plays, Renaissance Theaterworks, Milwaukee, 2016                         

TRIFLES by Susan Glaspell, American Players Theatre, Spring Green, WI, 2016

FOG by Eugene O’Neill, American Players Theatre, Spring Green, WI, 2016

BUS STOP by William Inge, Renaissance Theaterworks, Milwaukee, 2008

THE IMPORTANCE OF BEING EARNEST by Oscar Wilde, Renaissance Theaterworks, Milwaukee, 2005

CENSORED ON FINAL APPROACH, Milwaukee VA Medical Center, 2013

Written Works

A GIRL OF THE LIMBERLOST (1993) Based on Gene Stratton Porter's 1909 classic novel, A GIRL OF THE LIMBERLOST, Kohler's drama re-tells an enduring story beloved by generations of women. With a strong environmental theme, the adaptation captures the rich atmosphere of Indiana's once enormous Limberlost Swamp and the enthusiasm of those who loved it.

Production: Childrens Theatre of Madison, Madison, WI, 1993

COUNTING DAYS (1995)  Katherine Mansfield, a writer from the 1920s, mesmerized readers with her glamorous life and crystalline writing; Mary Kniesen, a contemporary, divorced empty-nester, becomes obsessed with Mansfield's Journals. COUNTING DAYS, a comic-drama, juxtaposes these two women: Mary, lost and structure-less and Mansfield, fiercely focused as she faced an early death from TB. Snatches of Mansfield's Journals punctuate Mary's flounderings until the spirit of Mansfield "appears" to aid Mary on her journey of self-discovery.
Production: Renaissance Theaterworks, Milwaukee, 1995
Susan Smith Blackburn Prize – Nominee 1995
Best New Regional Play – American Association of Theater Critics Nominee 1995
New Play Festival – Charlotte Repertory Theatre Finalist 1995

MIDNIGHT AND MOLL FLANDERS (2000) MIDNIGHT AND MOLL FLANDERS freely adapts Daniel Defoe's classic eighteenth-century novel, Moll Flanders. Moll is a larger-than-life woman whose spirited drive for love and survival led her to sexual adventures, multiple marriages and a career as an infamous thief. The play explores the influence of birth, free will, sex and circumstance in an era as fiercely entrepreneurial as our own. MIDNIGHT begins the night before Moll is to be hung at Newgate Prison. There she tells the story of her life to a Puritan bent on offering her a last, unlikely chance at salvation. A series of flashbacks punctuated by debates with the minister culminate in a courtroom scene where he unexpectedly pleads for her life. The play tracks a double journey of transformation for Moll and the minister who, despite himself, listens to her mythic, free-wheeling tale.
Production: University of Wisconsin–Milwaukee, 2000
 
BOSWELL'S DREAMS (2005) A comic-drama about the friendship between the 18th century writers James Boswell and Samuel Johnson. The play interweaves that time period with the 1950s and the  discovery of Boswell's journals by Joan, an American graduate student. Act I offers up scenes from David Garrick's HAMLET, gatherings of Johnson's literary club (including Oliver Goldsmith and Joshua Reynolds) and highlights from Boswell and Johnson's "Tour of the Scottish Hebrides" in 1773. ACT II counterpoints that period with scenes from 1950 at the Boswell family estate in Auchinleck, Scotland, where Joan and her professor are searching for Johnson material. There we witness Joan's discovery in the stable-loft of Boswell's Journals. Speaking through his Journals and life experiences, Boswell encourages Joan to resist pressure and stand on her own as Johnson encouraged him. She falls in love with the lively narratives.

Production: Renaissance Theaterworks, Off-Broadway Theatre, March 2005
Susan Smith Blackburn Prize – Nominee 2005 
Abington Award – Finalist 2005 
Wisconsin Wrights – Finalist 2005 
 
THE DIG (2008), Mattie's older brother Jamie told her stories of ancient myths when she was growing. As a lonely girl of fourteen she said goodbye to Jamie married and flew across the globe to pursue a career in archaeology. On a dig in Lebanon in 1968, he had a break with reality and changed profoundly. As the play begins in 1998, an international inquiry compels Mattie, now married and working for the family business in Chicago, to investigate the provenance of an ancient pot found on Jamie's Dig. The process brings to the surface her buried feelings of abandonment and questions about his breakdown – and reveals the underlying power of the myths that he once taught her. Through scenes inter-splicing time and place, the play explores psychology, mythology and relationship. As Mattie strives to protect Jamie from a potentially traumatic trial, she remembers him as the loving brother before the Dig. She recalls the stories of the stars and Greek myths he told her as a child and ultimately learns to accept him as he is.
Production: Renaissance Theaterworks, Milwaukee, WI, January 2009
Susan Smith Blackburn Prize – Nominee 2009 
Playwrights' Center Lab – Finalist 2009 
Playwrights First – Semi-Finalist 2009

WITCH HOUSE (2019 in development), How do we evaluate the worth of art? Does its survival matter only to its creator -- or to the community as well? Over decades, an outsider artist’s whimsical concrete statues have attracted traffic, vandals, and admirers…and resulted in the unfortunate label “witch.” After her death, the artist attends a neighborhood meeting to witness her exasperated neighbors’ debate over the fate of her beloved art. Tricky questions arise about taste, individual rights and property values…WITCH HOUSE light-heartedly explores the role of art and community. Developed with Josh Schmidt, composer, and Laura Gordon, director. DEVELOPMENT HISTORY (Readings):  Milwaukee Repertory Theater, Milwaukee, WI - 2016  Milwaukee Repertory Theater, Milwaukee, WI - 2015  Carthage College, Kenosha, WI - 2015  AWARDS  Todd McNerney Playwriting Award, Finalist - 2017  Wisconsin Wrights New Play Festival, Finalist - 2017

Journalism

Marie Kohler has been a freelance journalist for Wisconsin and national publications since 1980. She has written film reviews for the Milwaukee Sentinel; theater reviews for Art Muscle; feature articles for Milwaukee Magazine; essays for Milwaukee Footlights, Shepherd Express and The Wisconsin Academy Review; and pieces for American Theater Magazine. She has also been published in National Trust Magazine, Great Lakes Stages and Milwaukee Metro.

Her articles explore a range of subjects — from Wisconsin's tradition of Friday night fish fries to Frank Lloyd Wright's architecture to airport mosaics to trends in theater and film.

American Theatre Magazine

A Volley of Plays

X Marks the Spot

Shepherd Express

Milwaukee's Grassroots Storytellers - Ex Fabula’s community-building ‘Close Encounters’ 

From Milwaukee to Broadway and Back - A conversation with Chike Johnson

Fabulous Stories - Ex Fabula’s new Executive Director Megan McGee

Listening, Not Just Talking! Anne Strainchamps on Wisconsin Public Radio

INVIVO's Maurice Dumit on Health and Fitness 

Leslie Fitzwater: 'Once More with Feeling'…Piaf

CORE/El Centro's Healing Center

Secrets of the Milwaukee Public Museum

Beans and Barley's Long-Term Success

Dialogue with Laura Gordon

Josh Jaszewski - Theatergoer Extraordinaire

The Renewed Surprising Appeal of Mah Jongg

Indian Mounds: Wisconsin's Priceless Archaeological Treasures

Frank Lloyd Wright's Burnham Street Vision

Carlos Alves Beautifies Mitchell Airport

Dermond Peterson's Stunning, Milwaukee-Made Textiles

Bringing the Story Home

The Look of Law and Money

Milwaukee Magazine

Old Money

The Gathering

Wisconsin Academy Review

MIDSUMMER in October - An End of Season Bow

Milwaukee Metro

The Sendik Legacy

Milwaukee Footlights

A Carver of Bears

Awards

 A GIRL OF THE LIMBERLOST

Julie Harris Playwright Award, Beverly Hills Theatre Guild, Honorable Mention - 2014

 COUNTING DAYS

Best New Regional Play, American Theatre Critics Association - 1995

New Play Festival, Charlotte Repertory Theatre, Finalist - 1995

Susan Smith Blackburn Prize, Nominee - 1995 

 MIDNIGHT & MOLL FLANDERS

Best New Play - Milwaukee Magazine - 2000

Inkslinger Playwriting Competition, Semifinalist - 2018

 BOSWELL'S DREAMS

Susan Smith Blackburn Prize - Nominee - 2005

Best of Year - Milwaukee Magazine - 2005

Abingdon Award - Finalist - 2005

Wisconsin Wrights - Finalist - 2005 

 THE DIG

Susan Smith Blackburn Prize - Nominee - 2009

Playwrights' Center Lab - Finalist - 2009

Playwrights First - Semi-Finalist - 2009

 WITCH HOUSE

Todd McNerney Playwriting Award, Finalist - 2017

Wisconsin Wrights New Play Festival, Finalist - 2017

Artist of the Year 2005 Milwaukee Arts Board

References

External links
 Official website
 

1951 births
Living people
People from Sheboygan, Wisconsin
Kohler family of Wisconsin
Harvard University alumni
University of Wisconsin–Milwaukee alumni
Journalists from Wisconsin
Writers from Wisconsin